is a lake near Mount Fuji, Japan. It is located in the city of Fujinomiya, Shizuoka Prefecture, and is part of the Fuji-Hakone-Izu National Park.

History
Originally a swampy area, the lake was created in 1935 by diverting the waters of nearby Shiba River to create a reservoir for use in irrigation. The lake is now a popular vacation location, with camp sites, fishing, boating and is noted for its views of Mount Fuji.

External links

Fujinomiya home page
Ministry of the Environment　home page

Tanuki
Landforms of Shizuoka Prefecture
Fuji-Hakone-Izu National Park
Tourist attractions in Shizuoka Prefecture
Fujinomiya, Shizuoka